Lee Joseph Matthews (born 16 January 1979) is an English former footballer who played as a striker.

He began his career with Leeds United in 1997, after winning the FA Youth Cup with the club's youth team. He transferred to Bristol City in 2001, following loan spells at Notts County and Gillingham. During three years with City he was loaned out to Darlington, Bristol Rovers, and Yeovil Town. He signed with Port Vale in 2004, before moving on to Crewe Alexandra after a two years stay. After leaving Crewe in 2007 he joined Scottish club Livingston, before retiring from the game later in the year, at the age of 28. Dogged by injuries throughout his career, the talented striker was limited to a total of twenty goals in 138 league and cup appearances in his ten-year professional career – most of these appearances were as a substitute.

Career
Matthews began his career with Leeds United in February 1996, and was part of the same generation of youth team players as Paul Robinson, Jonathan Woodgate, Alan Smith and others. He made three substitute appearances for Leeds in the Premier League in early 1998. His debut came in a 2–0 win over Crystal Palace at Selhurst Park on 31 January, as he replaced Jimmy Floyd Hasselbaink on 86 minutes. He made his Elland Road debut in a 1–0 defeat to Southampton on 28 February, replacing Alan Maybury again on 86 minutes. Four days later he replaced Rod Wallace with one minute to go of a 1–0 victory over Tottenham Hotspur.

In late September 1998 he joined Notts County of the Second Division on a one-month loan deal. Playing competently, though not spectacularly, he returned to Elland Road after five appearances. Due to an injury, he had to wait until the end of March 2000 to see first team action again, joining promotion chasing Gillingham on an end-of-season loan. He played five games, having a minimal impact in seeing the "Gills" reach the play-off Final.

On 15 March he joined Bristol City on loan, after coming off the bench the next day to score against Millwall in a 2–1 win at Ashton Gate, he was signed permanently for £100,000 (initially £70,000, with a maximum bonus of £35,000 dependent on appearances) on 20 March. Three days later he did the same thing in a 3–1 win at Reading, his goal coming three minutes after coming onto the pitch. A semi-regular in 2001–02, he scored just five goals, though Two of these came in a Bristol derby game on 9 January, City celebrating a 3–0 home win in the Football League Trophy. He also scored in City's Severnside derby victory over Cardiff City. However, he missed many games that season due to injury, including an ankle injury which required surgery. In April 2002 he was transfer listed by manager Danny Wilson, along with Mickey Bell, Mark Lever, Steve Jones and Simon Clist.

If injury was a niggling concern the previous season, the 2002–03 season was one blighted by injury. Sustaining a back injury in a 3–1 home defeat to Queens Park Rangers, he was taken off by Wilson, who stated: "It needed to be done because we can't afford to lose someone like Lee for a lengthy spell." However the damage was done, a slipped disc as it turned to be, booked him a lengthy spell on the sidelines. It took another ten months for Matthews to recover.

At the start of the 2003–04 season he was used almost exclusively as a substitute. In mid-December he joined Third Division side Darlington on a one-month loan. He played six games, scoring one goal against Carlisle United. Upon returning to Bristol he went straight into the first team – though this was at Rovers rather than City. Wilson claimed this was to give Matthews a chance at regular football. Appreciated at The Memorial Stadium, Matthews considered making the move permanent. Caretaker-manager Phil Bater was keen to oblige, however the loan deal ended in March, Matthews having failed to score in nine games. He moved straight on to Yeovil Town, in a loan deal later extended to the end of the season. In June 2004 he was released by City, though manager Wilson soon followed him out the door.

In June 2004 he was signed to Port Vale, manager Martin Foyle looking to replace Scottish dynamo Stephen McPhee. Foyle and Matthews seemingly got off to a good start, Matthews claiming to be "really impressed" with Foyle. Despite being released by City, Matthews never held a grudge and his praise of the club persuaded Vale teammate Steve Brooker to sign with City in September 2004. He scored ten goals in 32 games for Vale during the 2004–05 season. This would prove to be his most successful season in terms of match fitness. The 2005–06 season was exceptionally poor for Matthews, his injury problems seemingly worsening, he played just three games and he was released upon the season's conclusion.

He spent the 2006–07 season with Crewe Alexandra, where again injuries severely limited his contribution, this time to ten appearances, all from the bench, never finding the net. He was once again released in the summer. He joined Livingston in August 2007, but was released shortly afterwards.

Later life
After retiring as a player, Matthews set up the football agency firm Sports Management International, along with Mark Obern.

Career statistics

References

External links

1979 births
Living people
Footballers from Middlesbrough
English footballers
Association football forwards
Leeds United F.C. players
Notts County F.C. players
Gillingham F.C. players
Bristol City F.C. players
Darlington F.C. players
Bristol Rovers F.C. players
Yeovil Town F.C. players
Port Vale F.C. players
Crewe Alexandra F.C. players
Livingston F.C. players
Premier League players
English Football League players
British sports agents
Association football agents